Robert Allen Fenwick Thorp (1900 – 5 May 1966) was a British Conservative Party politician.

He was Member of Parliament for Berwick-upon-Tweed from 1945 until he retired from the House of Commons at the 1951 general election.

References

External links 

1900 births
1966 deaths
Conservative Party (UK) MPs for English constituencies
UK MPs 1945–1950
UK MPs 1950–1951